George Leonard Prestige (1889–1955) was Fellow and Chaplain of New College, Oxford. His theological research showed particular competence in patristics and touched on ancient philosophy, e.g., in God in Patristic Thought (1936). He is perhaps best known for his illuminating and in places entertaining work, Fathers and Heretics (1954), given initially as Bampton Lectures in 1940. Prestige also wrote a biography of Charles Gore (1935) and St Paul's in Its Glory (1955).

From 1920 to 1944, Prestige held the country living of Upper Heyford, Oxfordshire. Many of his early books were written there. He also served as deputy editor of the Church Times, succeeding as editor in 1941 and serving until 1948.

In 1949 Prestige was secretary of the Church of England Council for Foreign Relations. He was also sent by Archbishop Geoffrey Fisher to Rome to explore avenues for ecumenical dialogue in the course of which he met with Giovanni Battista Montini, the future Pope Paul VI. Prestige died on 19 January 1955 in London. At his death Prestige was Canon Treasurer of St Paul's Cathedral.

References

External links
Bibliographic directory from Project Canterbury

1889 births
1955 deaths
20th-century English Anglican priests
20th-century English theologians
20th-century Protestant theologians
Anglo-Catholic clergy
Anglo-Catholic theologians
Chaplains of New College, Oxford
English Anglican theologians
English Anglo-Catholics
Fellows of New College, Oxford
Patristic scholars
People in Christian ecumenism
Treasurers of St Paul's Cathedral